Wednesday's Child is a 1934 Broadway two-act drama written by Leopold L. Atlas, produced by H.C. Potter and George Haight, staged by Potter with scenic design created by Tom Adrian Cracraft. It ran for 56 performances from January 16, 1934 to March 1934 at the Longacre Theatre.

The play was included in Burns Mantle's The Best Plays of 1933-1934.

It was adapted into the 1934 film Wednesday's Child directed by John S. Robertson and starring Edward Arnold and Karen Morley with Frank Thomas, Jr. recreating his role as Bobby Phillips. It was also adapted into the 1946 film Child of Divorce.

Cast

 Katherine Warren as Kathryn Phillips
 Walter N. Greaza as Ray Phillips
 Frank Thomas, Jr. as Bobby Phillips	
 Walter Gilbert as Howard Benton	
 Mona Bruns as Miss Chapman
 Leonard M. Barker as clerk	
 Stanton Bier as Herbert	
 Wyrley Birch as Dr. Stirling	
 Joie Brown as Georgie	
 Harry Clancy as Joie	
 Alfred Dalrymple as Mr. Keyes	
 Harry Hanlon as Judge	
 Sally Hodges as Carrie	
 Richard Jack as Chic Nevins	
 Lester Lonergan, III as Alfred	
 Robert Mayors as Lenny	
 Cele McLaughlin as Louise	
 George Pembroke as Mr. Proctor

References

External links 
 
 

1934 plays
Broadway plays
Plays set in the United States
American plays adapted into films